Vernonia sechellensis was a species of plant in the daisy family Asteraceae. It has not been seen since its original discovery on the island of Mahé in 1874. It was endemic to the Seychelles.

References 

sechellensis
Extinct plants